Robert Molimard (16 December 1927 – 9 January 2020) was a French doctor and professor at Paris-Sud University. He was a pioneer in tobacco research in France.

Publications
Tabac : comprendre la dépendance pour agir
La fume : Smoking (2003)
Petit manuel de Défume : se reconstruire sans tabac, Éditions De Borée (2003)
L’Homme, avatar de Dieu (2016)

References

1927 births
2020 deaths
Academic staff of Paris-Sud University
20th-century French physicians
21st-century French physicians
People from Puy-de-Dôme